In Major League Baseball (MLB), the Player of the Week Award is given weekly during the regular season to two outstanding players, one each in the National League (NL) and American League (AL). Players at all positions are eligible for the award.

The award was first issued on April 16, 1973, by NL president Chub Feeney—it was won by outfielder Jimmy Wynn of the Houston Astros, then a member of the NL. The first AL winner was Reggie Jackson, then with the Oakland Athletics, announced on April 10, 1974.

The most times a player has won the award is 16, accomplished by both Miguel Cabrera and Manny Ramirez. Several other players have won the award 12 or more times: Barry Bonds (15), Albert Pujols (14), Frank Thomas (14), Alex Rodriguez (13), Nolan Ryan (13), George Brett (12), Mike Piazza (12), and Gary Sheffield (12).

The below tables list all winners since 2008, along with each player's team and a recap of the player's accomplishments for the week in question. A complete list of winners, since inception of the award, can be found on the MLB.com and Baseball-Reference.com websites as noted below.

2022

2021

2020

2019

2018

2017

2016

2015

2014

2013

2012

2011

2010

2009

2008

See also

List of MLB awards

References

External links
 
 

Player of the Week
Awards established in 1973